Pamphalea is a genus of flowering plants in the family Asteraceae. The genus was first described by Lagasca in 1811, who spelled it Panphalea. de Candolle emended the spelling to Pamphalea in 1812, and that spelling has been generally accepted.

 Species
 Pamphalea araucariophila Cabrera - Rio Grande do Sul, Santa Catarina
 Pamphalea bupleurifolia Less. - Uruguay, Brazil (Rio Grande do Sul), Argentina (Buenos Aires, Corrientes, Entre Ríos)
 Pamphalea cardaminifolia Less. - Rio Grande do Sul, Santa Catarina
 Pamphalea commersonii Cass. - Rio Grande do Sul, Paraná, Uruguay
 Pamphalea heterophylla Less. - Rio Grande do Sul, Uruguay, Buenos Aires, Corrientes, Entre Ríos, Misiones
 Pamphalea maxima Less. - Rio Grande do Sul, Santa Catarina, Uruguay
 Pamphalea missionum Cabrera - Rio Grande do Sul, Corrientes, Paraguay, Misiones
 Pamphalea ramboi Cabrera - Rio Grande do Sul
 Pamphalea smithii Cabrera - Rio Grande do Sul, Paraná, Santa Catarina
 Pamphalea tenuissima C.Trujillo, Bonif. & E.Pasini

References

Asteraceae genera
Mutisioideae